Kulwant Singh Virk (20 May 1921 – 24 December 1987) was an author who wrote mostly in Punjabi but also extensively in English. His short stories were translated into several other languages, including Russian and Japanese.

Kulwant Singh Virk was born on 20 May 1921 in the village of Phullarwan, Sheikhupura district, Punjab Province, British India.

Virk's writings have won several awards. In 1958 he won his first award for his short story compilation titled Dudh Da Chhappar (A Pond of Milk). He won the national Sahitya Academy Award in 1968 for his short story compilation Nave Lok (New Folks). He was also recognised by the Literary Forum of Canada in 1984 and acclaimed for his contribution to literature by the Punjab Sahitya Academy in 1986.

After his retirement, Virk temporarily moved to Canada but returned to Punjab after a few months. He suffered a devastating stroke in 1987 and travelled back to Canada to receive medical care. As a result, he died on 24 December 1987 in Toronto, Ontario, Canada.

Story collection 

 Chah Vela(1950)
 Dharti te Akash(1951)
 Turhi di Pand(1954)
 Ekas ke hum barik(1955)
 Dudh da Chapar(1958)
 Golan(1961)
 Virk diyan Kahaniyan(1966)
 Nave Lok(1967)
 Duadashi
 Astbaazi(1984)
 Merian Saarian kahanian(1986)

Translation works 
A Farewell to Arms (Ernest Hemingway)

Books about Virk 

 Kulwant Singh Virk da Kahani Sansar: Waryam Singh Sandhu
 Kahanikar Kulwant Singh Virk: Dr. Randhir Singh
 Chand and Dr. Bikram Singh Ghuman
 Kulwant Singh Virk Ik Adheyan: T.R. Vinod

Awards 

 Language Department Punjab (1959)
 Sahitya Akademi Award (1968)
 Honored as Shiromani Sahityakar by Department of Languages, Punjab (1985)

Legacy 
Many of Virk's stories have been translated into Indian and foreign languages. A book was published in Russia under the name of Dharti Henthla Balad, Dudh da Chapar, Khabal etc. were dramatized on television.

References

External links

ਪੰਜਾਬੀਪੀਡੀਆ ਉੱਤੇ ਕੁਲਵੰਤ ਸਿੰਘ ਵਿਰਕ ਬਾਰੇ ਲੇਖ

Further reading

1921 births
1987 deaths
Punjabi people
Punjabi-language writers
Recipients of the Sahitya Akademi Award in Punjabi
People from Sheikhupura District
Indian male short story writers
20th-century Indian short story writers
Writers from Punjab, India
20th-century Indian male writers
English-language writers from India